Look at Me is the debut album by Mississippi rappers Cadillac Don & J-Money, released on November 7, 2006.

Track listing 
 Look at Me (feat. Bun B)
 Dat Ain't Nothin' (feat. Squid)
 Peanut Butter & Jelly
 Weekend (feat. April and G Smith)
 Ice (feat. Paul Wall)
 Showin' Out (feat. Yung Blaze)
 Walk It Like U Talk It (feat. Big Fruit)
 Fuck Dat Bitch
 Go Hard (feat. G Smith and Yung Blaze)
 Do Some Strange
 Show Them Dickies (feat. DJ Redd Mann)
 Pimp
 Like Me (feat. M.O.E. and Rush)
 Work for Dat
 Got to Believe

2006 debut albums
Cadillac Don & J-Money albums